A Braitenberg vehicle is a concept conceived in a thought experiment by the Italian-Austrian cyberneticist Valentino Braitenberg. The book models the animal world in a minimalistic and constructive way, from simple reactive behaviours (like phototaxis) through the simplest vehicles, to the formation of concepts, spatial behaviour, and generation of ideas.

For the simplest vehicles, the motion of the vehicle is directly controlled by some sensors (for example photo cells). Yet the resulting behaviour may appear complex or even intelligent.

Mechanism 

A Braitenberg vehicle is an agent that can autonomously move around based on its sensor inputs. It has primitive sensors that measure some stimulus at a point, and wheels (each driven by its own motor) that function as actuators or effectors. In the simplest configuration, a sensor is directly connected to an effector, so that a sensed signal immediately produces a movement of the wheel.

Depending on how sensors and wheels are connected, the vehicle exhibits different behaviors (which can be goal-oriented). This means that, depending on the sensor-motor wiring, it appears to strive to achieve certain situations and to avoid others, changing course when the situation changes.

The connections between sensors and actuators for the simplest vehicles (2 and 3) can be ipsilateral or contralateral, and excitatory or inhibitory, producing four combinations with different behaviours named fear, aggression, liking, and love. These correspond to biological positive and negative taxes present in many animals species.

Examples 

The following examples are some of Braitenberg's simplest vehicles.

Vehicle 1 - Getting Around
The first vehicle has one sensor (e.g. a temperature detector) that directly stimulates its single wheel in a directly proportional way. The vehicle moves ideally in one dimension only and can stand still or move forward at varying speed depending on the sensed temperature. When forces like asymmetric friction come into play, the vehicle could deviate from its straight line motion in unpredictable ways akin to Brownian motion.

This behavior might be understood by a human observer as a creature that is 'alive' like an insect and 'restless', never stopping in its movement. The low velocity in regions of low temperature might be interpreted as a preference for cold areas.

Vehicle 2a 
A slightly more complex agent has two (left and right) symmetric sensors (e.g. light detectors) each stimulating a wheel on the same side of the body. This vehicle represents a model of negative animal tropotaxis. It obeys the following rule:
 More light right → right wheel turns faster → turns towards the left, away from the light.
This is more efficient as a behavior to escape from the light source, since the creature can move in different directions, and tends to orient towards the direction from which least light comes.

In another variation, the connections are negative or inhibitory: more light → slower movement. In this case, the agents move away from the dark and towards the light.

Vehicle 2b 
The agent has the same two (left and right) symmetric sensors (e.g. light detectors), but each one stimulating a wheel on the other side of the body. It obeys the following rule:
 More light left → right wheel turns faster → turns towards the left, closer to the light.
As a result, the robot follows the light; it moves to be closer to the light.

Behavior 

In a complex environment with several sources of stimulus, Braitenberg vehicles will exhibit complex and dynamic behavior.

Depending on the connections between sensors and actuators, a Braitenberg vehicle might move close to a source, but not touch it, run away very fast, or describe circles or figures-of-eight around a point.

This behavior is undoubtedly goal-directed, flexible and adaptive, and might even appear to be intelligent, the way some minimal intelligence is attributed to a cockroach. Yet, the functioning of the agent is purely mechanical, without any information processing or other apparently cognitive processes. 

Analog robots, such as those used in the BEAM robotics approach, often utilise these sorts of behaviors.

See also 
 BEAM robotics
 Turtle (robot)
 Unicycle cart

References 
Notes

Lambrinos, D., Scheier, Ch. (1995). Extended braitenberg architectures. Technical Report AI Lab no. 95.10, Computer Science Department, University of Zurich.
 Headleand, Chris, Llyr Ap Cynedd, and William J. Teahan. "Berry Eaters: Learning Colour Concepts with Template Based Evolution Evaluation." ALIFE 14: The Fourteenth Conference on the Synthesis and Simulation of Living Systems. Vol. 14.

External links
Valentino Braitenberg's homepage
A software Braitenberg vehicle simulator
Another Braitenberg vehicle simulator, lets you play around with different settings, vehicles and sources
An Apple Playground on Braitenberg Vehicles, an APPLE playground in SWIFT language which implements some Braitenberg vehicles, it lets experiment in a very interactive way.

Cybernetics
BEAM robotics
Thought experiments